Howard Francis Fox (March 1, 1921 – October 9, 1955) was an American professional baseball pitcher, who played in Major League Baseball (MLB) for the Cincinnati Reds, Philadelphia Phillies, and Baltimore Orioles, in 9 seasons, between  and . He batted and threw right-handed. 

The year after Fox's last big league appearance, he acquired a local tavern in San Antonio, while he pitched for the Missions of the Double-A Texas League; a month into the offseason, he was stabbed to death at age 34 during a disturbance at that establishment.

Early life
Fox was born in Coburg, Oregon. He played baseball and basketball at the University of Oregon.

Major league career
In , Fox collected nine victories, with a 3.83 earned run average (ERA), in a career-high 228 innings, but suffered 14 losses.

Before the 1952 season, Fox was dealt to Philadelphia in a seven-player transaction that included Smoky Burgess, Niles Jordan, Eddie Pellagrini, Connie Ryan, Andy Seminick, and Dick Sisler. In , he played for Triple-A Baltimore, and a year appeared in 38 games for the MLB Orioles during their first year in MLB since 1902.

In nine major league seasons, Fox posted a 43–72 record, with 342 strikeouts, a 4.33 ERA, in 248 appearances, including 132 starts, 42 complete games, five shutouts, six saves, and  innings of work. In 253 games, Fox hit .189, with two home runs, and 25 runs batted in (RBI).

Fox also played in the Venezuelan Winter League (1953–) and in the 1954 Caribbean Series. In the Venezuelan Winter League, he was pitching for Pastora when popular player Luis Aparicio, Sr., of Gavilanes took himself out of a 1953 game and allowed his son, Luis Aparicio, to pinch hit for his first professional baseball at bat. The younger Aparicio became a star MLB player and member of the Baseball Hall of Fame.

Death
While he was a minor league pitcher in the Texas League for the San Antonio Missions in 1955, Fox purchased a San Antonio tavern. That October, he was attempting to kick three men out of the bar and a struggle ensued in front of the business. Fox was stabbed three times and he died as he was trying to crawl back to the door of the establishment. A San Antonio College student, John Strickland, was arrested and two other men were held as material witnesses. Strickland was charged with murder with malice and another man was indicted on an aggravated assault charge in the stabbing injury of Fox's bartender.

References

External links

Allen, Malcolm, Howie Fox. Society for American Baseball Research Biography Project
Howie Fox at Baseball Library
1955 Murders: Howie Fox at The Deadball Era
Howie Fox at Pura Pelota (Venezuelan Professional Baseball League)

1921 births
1955 deaths
1955 murders in the United States
American expatriate baseball players in Venezuela
Baltimore Orioles players
Baltimore Orioles (IL) players
Baseball players from Oregon
Birmingham Barons players
Cincinnati Reds players
Deaths by stabbing in Texas
Lácteos de Pastora players
Leones del Caracas players
Major League Baseball pitchers
American murder victims
Oregon Ducks baseball players
People from Lane County, Oregon
People murdered in Texas
Male murder victims
Philadelphia Phillies players
San Antonio Missions players
Syracuse Chiefs players